Harriet Christina Cany Peale (1799–1869) was an American landscape, portrait, and genre painter of the mid-nineteenth century. Although sometimes described as a copyist, a greater share of her oeuvre has been made public in recent years, allowing Cany Peale to earn recognition for her genre and landscape paintings. She has been located in contemporary scholarship as an artist of the Hudson River School.

Family 
Harriet Christina Cany was born in 1799, the daughter of Charles and Mary Cany, in Philadelphia. She was widowed sometime before 1840, and worked in her family's "fancy goods business." She studied with the artist Rembrandt Peale, whom she married in 1840, becoming his second wife. Her association with the more famous Peale usually places her within the famous Peale family of painters, overshadowing her individual achievements as an artist in her own right.

Career 
Harriet Cany Peale first exhibited in 1840 at the Pennsylvania Academy of Fine Arts, where she continued to exhibit for the rest of her life, as well as at the Artists' Fund Society. She and her husband shared a studio in Philadelphia.

Her 1848 painting, Her Mistress's Clothes (private collection) has gained notoriety for its exploration of power differentiation in a scene of an African American woman dressed—presumably by her employer—in a bourgeois white woman's clothes and jewelry. Cany Peale depicts the "mistress" as an ideal, serene, light-skinned figure clasping the neck of the African American servant, whose features appear cruder in contrast. Together, they peer into a mirror to examine the effect of the clothes (relics of an earlier generation) and jewelry on the servant.

Her landscape, Kaaterskill Clove (also in a private collection), was the key landscape image of the 2010 traveling exhibition, "Remember the Ladies: Women Artists of the Hudson River School," organized by the Thomas Cole Historic Site.

Harriet Cany Peale died in 1869.

Collections 
 Charles S. and Isabella V. McMullen Museum, Boston College, Boston, MA
 Chrysler Museum of Art, Norfolk, VA
 Pennsylvania Academy of the Fine Arts, Philadelphia, PA
 The Newark Museum, Newark, NJ
 The Washington County Museum of Fine Arts, Hagerstown, MD

References

External links 
Archives of American Art: Finding Aid to the Rembrandt and Harriet Peale Collection, circa 1820-1932
New York History Blog: Celebrating Women of the Hudson River School
Smithsonian Institution Art Inventories: Harriet Cany Peale paintings
Smithsonian Institution Magazine Review of the 2010 "Remember the Ladies" exhibition featuring Harriet Cany Peale's painting

Artists from Philadelphia
Painters from Pennsylvania
American women painters
1799 births
1869 deaths
Hudson River School painters